Lieutenant-General Sir (George) Bryan Milman  (30 December 1822 – 28 January 1915) was a British Army officer who served as colonel of the Northumberland Fusiliers. His daughter was the writer Lena Milman.

Military career
Milman was commissioned into the 5th Regiment of Foot on 24 May 1839. As a captain he saw action as a member of the advance guard in the first relief of Lucknow in September 1857 during the Indian Rebellion. In retirement became major of the Tower of London in 1870 and colonel of the Northumberland Fusiliers in 1899.

He was the recipient of the Gold Medal from the Royal Humane Society for swimming ashore to seek assistance for 5 fellow officers after their boat capsized in bad weather.

References

 

1822 births
1915 deaths
British Army lieutenant generals
Knights Commander of the Order of the Bath
Royal Northumberland Fusiliers officers
British military personnel of the Indian Rebellion of 1857
English justices of the peace